The following is a list of 2017 box office number-one films in Italy.

References

2017
Italy
2017 in Italian cinema